Chilli Creek is a stream in the U.S. state of Mississippi.

Chilli Creek is a name derived from either the Choctaw language or Chickasaw language, but scholars are divided whether it means "creek branch" or "dry river".

References

Rivers of Mississippi
Rivers of Benton County, Mississippi
Mississippi placenames of Native American origin